The Chlamydiaceae are a family of gram-negative bacteria that belongs to the phylum Chlamydiota, order Chlamydiales. Chlamydiaceae species express the family-specific lipopolysaccharide epitope αKdo-(2→8)-αKdo-(2→4)-αKdo (previously called the genus-specific epitope).  Chlamydiaceae ribosomal RNA genes all have at least 90% DNA sequence identity. Chlamydiaceae species have varying inclusion morphology, varying extrachromosomal plasmid content, and varying sulfadiazine resistance.

The family Chlamydiaceae currently includes one genus and one candidate genus: Chlamydia and candidatus Clavochlamydia.

Chlamydia

Three species belong to Chlamydia:  C. trachomatis, C. muridarum, and C. suis.  C. trachomatis has been found only in humans, C. muridarum in hamsters and mice (family Muridae), and C. suis in swine.  Chlamydia species produce a small amount of detectable glycogen and have two ribosomal operons.

Chlamydia trachomatis is the cause of an infection commonly transmitted sexually (often referred as just "Chlamydia") and also is the cause of trachoma, an infectious eye disease, spread by eye, nose, and throat secretions.

Phylogeny

Taxonomy
The currently accepted taxonomy is based on the List of Prokaryotic names with Standing in Nomenclature (LPSN) and National Center for Biotechnology Information (NCBI)

 "Ca. Amphibiichlamydia" Martel et al. 2012
 Chlamydia Jones et al. 1945
 "Chlamydiifrater" Vorimore et al. 2021
 Chlamydophila Everett, Bush & Andersen 1999
 "Ca. Medusoplasma" Viver et al. 2017

See also
 List of bacterial orders
 List of bacteria genera

References

Chlamydiota
Bacteria families